"Get It Together" is a song performed by James Brown. Released in October 1967 as a two-part single, it charted #11 R&B and #40 Pop. Both parts also appeared on the album I Can't Stand Myself When You Touch Me. Donald A. Guarisco of Allmusic described the song as "a taut, minimalist tune that combines soulful but frantically paced verse melodies with a bubbling, two-note staccato chorus."

Brown performs "Get It Together" in the concert films James Brown: Man to Man and Live at the Boston Garden: April 5, 1968.

Personnel
 James Brown - lead vocal

with the James Brown Orchestra:
 Waymond Reed - trumpet
 Joe Dupars - trumpet
 Levi Rasbury - trombone
 Alfred "Pee Wee" Ellis - alto saxophone
 Maceo Parker - tenor saxophone
 Eldee Williams - tenor saxophone
 St. Clair Pinckney - baritone saxophone
 Jimmy Nolen - guitar
 Alphonso "Country" Kellum - guitar
 Bernard Odum - bass
 John "Jabo" Starks - drums

References

External links
 AllMusic review

James Brown songs
Songs written by James Brown
1967 singles
Songs written by Alfred "Pee Wee" Ellis
1967 songs
King Records (United States) singles